Canal+ was a Spanish commercial television channel launched in September 1990 on terrestrial television frequencies. The channel was operated by Sogecable, before its eventual sale to Telefónica, and was available on the digital satellite television and IPTV platform Movistar+.

In 1997, new channels using the Canal+ brand were launched in Spain, following the launch of Canal Satélite Digital. Just as on the other markets where Canal+ was present, the channels were named after colours: Canal+ Rojo (Canal+ Red) and Canal+ Azul (Canal+ Blue). A special channel broadcasting content in 16:9 aspect ratio was launched later, but it was replaced by a time-shift channel in 2001. In 2003, the colour channels were replaced with the second channel called Canal+ 2 and three dedicated movie channels and three dedicated sports channels.

In 2005, the Spanish government agreed to a change in the license terms for the channel. The permission to change the channel from a mostly encrypted channel to a 24-hour free-to-air channel was officially given by the council of ministers on 29 July 2005. From November 2005, its analogue terrestrial frequencies were given to Sogecable's new channel named Cuatro ("Four").

A High-definition version of Canal+ (Canal+ HD) began airing in 2008. In 2010, it became the first Spanish channel to offer 3D TV through Canal+ 3D.
Around the same time, Canal+ begun to be offered in other pay-TV operators in Spain outside of Digital+, and in 2011 the channel was renamed as Canal+ 1.

On 8 July 2015, following the creation of Movistar+, cable providers outside of Movistar+, stopped carrying the channel, and it reverted back to its original name of Canal+.

From 1 February 2016, it was replaced by a new channel, #0 (Cero).

See also
 Groupe Canal+

References

Canal+ (Spanish TV provider)
Defunct television channels in Spain
Television stations in the Community of Madrid
Mass media in Madrid
Companies based in the Community of Madrid
Television channels and stations established in 1990
Television channels and stations disestablished in 2016
1990 establishments in Spain
2016 disestablishments in Spain
Defunct companies of Spain
PRISA TV